Sir Richard Heron, 1st Baronet (1726 – 18 January 1805) was a politician in the Kingdom of Ireland.

He was the youngest son of Robert Heron of Newark-on-Trent, Nottinghamshire. He was admitted to Lincoln's Inn in 1748, made a Commissioner of Bankruptcy in 1751 and a Remembrancer in the Exchequer in 1754.

He sat in the Irish House of Commons as a Member of Parliament (MP) for Lisburn from 1777 to 1783, and served as Chief Secretary for Ireland from 1776 to 1780. He was sworn of the Privy Council of Ireland on 25 January 1777.

He was made a Baronet in 1778, of Newark upon Trent.

He died in 1805 at his home in London. He had married Jane, widow of Stephen Thompson, daughter and coheir of Abraham Hall. He had no children and thus the baronetcy and his estates in Lincolnshire passed to his nephew Sir Robert Heron, 2nd Baronet.

References 

1726 births
1805 deaths
People from Newark-on-Trent
Members of the Parliament of Ireland (pre-1801) for County Antrim constituencies
Baronets in the Baronetage of Great Britain
Irish MPs 1776–1783
Members of the Privy Council of Ireland
Chief Secretaries for Ireland